Mercedes Pereyra (born 7 May 1987) is an Argentine footballer who plays as a forward for River Plate. She played for the Argentina women's national football team at the 2008 Summer Olympics.

See also
 Argentina at the 2008 Summer Olympics

References

External links

 

1987 births
Living people
People from General Rodríguez Partido
Argentine women's footballers
Women's association football forwards
Club Atlético River Plate (women) players
Argentina women's international footballers
2007 FIFA Women's World Cup players
Footballers at the 2008 Summer Olympics
Olympic footballers of Argentina
Competitors at the 2014 South American Games
South American Games gold medalists for Argentina
South American Games medalists in football
Argentine expatriate women's footballers
Argentine expatriate sportspeople in Colombia
Expatriate women's footballers in Colombia
Sportspeople from Buenos Aires Province